The Abel E. Eaton House is a historic house located in Union, Oregon, United States. It is listed on the National Register of Historic Places on November 2, 1977. This fine French Second Empire-style house was built in 1904 for Abel Elsworth Eaton, a prosperous Union businessman, community leader, and mayor. It stands in the north Union neighborhood that was the town's upscale residential area during its period of rapid and vigorous growth in the late 19th and early 20th centuries.

See also
National Register of Historic Places listings in Union County, Oregon

References

Houses on the National Register of Historic Places in Oregon
Houses completed in 1904
Houses in Union County, Oregon
National Register of Historic Places in Union County, Oregon
1904 establishments in Oregon
Individually listed contributing properties to historic districts on the National Register in Oregon